Pisidium is a genus of very small or minute freshwater clams known as pill clams or pea clams, aquatic bivalve molluscs in the family Sphaeriidae, the pea clams and fingernail clams.

In some bivalve classification systems, the family Sphaeriidae is referred to as Pisidiidae, and occasionally Pisidium species are grouped in a subfamily known as Pisidiinae.

Pisidium and taphonomy
In large enough quantities, the minute shells of these bivalves can affect environmental conditions, and this change in conditions can positively affect the ability of organic remains in the immediate environment to fossilize (one aspect of taphonomy). For example, in the Dinosaur Park Formation, the fossil remains of hadrosaur eggshells are rare. This is because the breakdown of tannins from the local coniferous vegetation caused the ancient waters to be acidic, and therefore usually eggshell fragments dissolved in the water before they had a chance to be fossilized.

Hadrosaur eggshell fragments are however present in two microfossil sites in the area. Both of these sites are dominated by preserved shells of invertebrate life, primarily shells of pisidiids. The slow dissolution of these minute bivalve shells released calcium carbonate into the water, raising the water's pH high enough that it prevented the hadrosaur eggshell fragments from dissolving before they could be fossilized.

Extant subgenera and species
Extant subgenera and species within the genus Pisidium include:

Subgenus Euglesa Jenyns, 1832
Pisidium casertanum (Poli, 1791)
Pisidium globulare Clessin, 1873
Pisidium personatum Malm, 1855

Subgenus Pisidium Pfeiffer, 1821
Pisidium amnicum (O. F. Müller, 1774)
Pisidium dilatatum Westerlund, 1897

Subgenus Cyclocalyx Dall, 1903
Pisidium hinzi Kuiper, 1975
Pisidium obtusale (Lamarck, 1818)

Subgenus Tropidocyclas Dall, 1903
Pisidium henslowanum (Sheppard, 1823)
Pisidium lilljeborgii Clessin, 1886
Pisidium supinum A. Schmidt, 1851
Pisidium waldeni Kuiper, 1975

Subgenus Hiberneuglesa Starobogatov, 1983
Pisidium hibernicum Westerlund, 1894

Subgenus Cingulipisidium Pirogov & Starobogatov, 1974
Pisidium crassum Stelfox, 1918
Pisidium milium Held, 1836
Pisidium nitidum Jenyns, 1832
Pisidium pseudosphaerium Favre, 1927

Subgenus Pseudeupera Germain, 1909
Pisidium pulchellum Jenyns, 1832
Pisidium subtruncatum Malm, 1855

Subgenus Neopisidium Odhner, 1921
Pisidium conventus Clessin, 1867

Subgenus Odhneripisidium Kuiper, 1962
Pisidium moitessierianum Paladilhe, 1866
Pisidium tenuilineatum Stelfox, 1918

Subgenus Afropisidium Kuiper, 1962
Pisidium giraudi Bourguignat, 1885
Pisidium hodgkini (Suter, 1905)
Pisidium pirothi Jickeli, 1881

Subgenus unknown
Pisidium artifex Kuiper, 1960
Pisidium stewarti Preston, 1909

Subgenus 
Pisidium annandalei Prashad, 1925
Pisidium edlaueri Kuiper, 1960
Pisidium javanum van Benthem Jutting, 1931
Pisidium maasseni Kuiper, 1987
Pisidium punctiferum (Guppy, 1867)
Pisidium raddei Dybowski, 1902
 undescribed Pisidium species from Africa (Kuiper, in prep., awaiting additional records)

Footnotes

References
 Tanke, D.H. and Brett-Surman, M.K. 2001. Evidence of Hatchling and Nestling-Size Hadrosaurs (Reptilia:Ornithischia) from Dinosaur Provincial Park (Dinosaur Park Formation: Campanian), Alberta, Canada. pp. 206–218. In: Mesozoic Vertebrate Life—New Research Inspired by the Paleontology of Philip J. Currie. Edited by D.H. Tanke and K. Carpenter. Indiana University Press: Bloomington. xviii + 577 pp.

External links

 Pisidium keyed, described and illustrated in Danmarks Fauna (Georg Mandahl-Barth)
Pisidium images at Consortium for the Barcode of Life
 https://web.archive.org/web/20141128091542/http://sunsite.ualberta.ca/Projects/Aquatic_Invertebrates/?Page=20

 
Bivalve genera